The men's doubles tournament at the 1989 Australian Open was held from 16 through 29 January 1989 on the outdoor hard courts at the Flinders Park in Melbourne, Australia. Rick Leach and Jim Pugh won the title, defeating Darren Cahill and Mark Kratzmann in the final.

Seeds

Draw

Finals

Top half

Section 1

Section 2

Bottom half

Section 3

Section 4

External links
 1989 Australian Open – Men's draws and results at the International Tennis Federation

Men's Doubles
Australian Open (tennis) by year – Men's doubles